In marketing, a fixed value-added resource (FVAR) is an item that, whilst seeming unrelated to the core product, adds value to the core product or service offering. The concept originated from entrepreneur Edward A. Blake in his attempt to quickly explain the purpose of a resource he was promoting to online service providers.

Categorization
In order for an item to be classed as an FVAR, Edward A Blake, who originated the concept, set out the following three requirements:
The item must be fixed in nature. That is, an item to be found on a constant basis within the core product,
The item must not be directly related in content to that of the core product. For instance, a 'Model of the Day' feature would be an FVAR if placed within a daily tabloid newspaper such as The Sun, but could not be classified as such if featured within a men's magazine such as Playboy.
The item must add some form of distinct value to the existing value proposition of the core product. For instance, many people subscribe to a daily newspaper in the knowledge that they will derived added value from the FVAR, such as the daily crossword puzzle, irrespective of the overall quality of that day's newspaper.

Examples
Some examples of FVARs are:
Crossword puzzles, Sudoku and other puzzle games featured within magazines, newspapers, and websites,
Daily Cartoons featured within magazines, newspapers, and websites
Free travel/education/health/career guides featured upon a website
The 'Page 3' girl feature found within The Sun and in its online version

References

Product management